Harned may refer to:

Harned, Kentucky, an unincorporated community in Breckinridge County

People with the surname
Corey Harned, lacrosse player
Richard Harned, kinetic sculptor and glass artist
Virginia Harned, stage actress